East Lavington, formerly Woolavington, is a village and civil parish in the District of Chichester in West Sussex, England. It is located six kilometres (4 miles) south of Petworth, west of the A285 road.

West Lavington was formerly an exclave of Woolavington.

The parish has a land area of 797 hectares (1968 acres). In the 2001 census 357 people lived in 87 households, of whom 129 were economically active. It includes the settlement of Upper Norwood.

The parish is dominated by Seaford College, a private school which owns . The main school building, previously Lavington Park country house, is a Grade II* listed building. St Peter's parish church, also Grade II* listed, has become the school chapel.

An Elizabethan manor house was built at "Woolavington" in 1587. The old house at Lavington Park is long demolished, but the 1587 building contract described how the chimneys, windows, and corner quoins should be made "verie artyficiallie and conninglie".

Notable people
Notable residents have included Gerard Fairlie and David Young, Baron Young of Graffham.

References

External links

Villages in West Sussex